Michael Copeland (born 23 June 1954) is a former Ulster Unionist Party (UUP) politician, who was a Member of the Northern Ireland Assembly (MLA) for East Belfast from 2003 to 2007, and then from 2010 to 2015.

Copeland was born in Belfast and was educated at Lisnasharragh Primary School, Lisnasharragh Secondary School, Castlereagh College and the Royal Military Academy Sandhurst becoming a lieutenant of the Ulster Defence Regiment, HM Armed Forces.

Political career

Copeland was first elected to Castlereagh Borough Council in 2001 and in May 2002 was elected Deputy Mayor of Castlereagh.

In 2002, he was elected chairman of Castlereagh District Policing Partnership. He later resigned in protest at the treatment of the RUC full-time Reserve. He also served as Director of Castlereagh Local Strategy Partnership.

After defeating incumbent MLA Ian Adamson for the East Belfast UUP nomination for the 2003 Assembly Election he was elected to the Northern Ireland Assembly. He was re-selected to stand for the constituency in the elections in 2007 but lost his seat. Copeland remains an extremely active figure in local governmental politics within Northern Ireland: maintaining a keen interest in domestic, socioeconomic and housing problems. He was re-elected to the Northern Ireland Assembly as MLA for East Belfast in the Assembly Elections in May 2011.

A member of the Orange Order and the Royal Black Institution, Copeland has served as the party's Parades spokesman.

He stepped down from the Assembly due to health reasons was replaced by Andy Allen.

Views

Copeland has spoken in favour of same-sex marriage, saying he "backed the change''."

Personal
His wife Sonia was elected to Belfast City Council in the 2014 Northern Ireland local elections. She represents the Titanic ward. They have two children and he is a member of the Church of Ireland.

References

External links
 Michael Copeland MLA - Official Website as at 4 January 2014
 NI Assembly biography
 Stratagem biography
 Castlereagh Council biography as at 28 August 2008

1954 births
Living people
Politicians from Belfast
Ulster Defence Regiment officers
Ulster Unionist Party MLAs
Northern Ireland MLAs 2003–2007
Northern Ireland MLAs 2011–2016
Graduates of the Royal Military Academy Sandhurst
Members of Castlereagh Borough Council
Military personnel from Belfast